Kaafir (English: Disbeliever) is a 22 episodic Pakistani psychological thriller television series, produced by Samina Humayun Saeed and Shahzad Nasib under the production banner Six Sigma Entertainment. It is directed by Shahid Shafaat and written by Abdul Khaaliq Khan. The seria aired on ARY Digital in 2011. It was also broadcast in India on Zindagi as Izzat.

Premise
Kaafir revolves around a girl named Izzat (Khan), who is an outspoken strong soul. On other hand Shahan (Saeed), a strong and powerful channel head who considers himself a God and is a kaafir [disbeliever (more specifically an atheist)]. Things take a worst turn where Shahan gets humiliated by Izzat and the latter swears revenge from her.

Shahan swears to himself that he will destroy her. Shahan keeps his promise as he first makes her seem to be a loose character girl in front of the boy she loves who happens to be Shahan's brother Azaan which still makes things easier for Shahaan. Shahaan ends up raping Izzat. Izzat is devastated after the incident. Situation takes another twist when Izzat's mother, Mehvish, dies.

Cast
 Humayun Saeed As Shahan Ali Khan
 Ayesha Khan As Izzat
 Sabreen Hisbani as Mehreen, Shahan's wife
 Affan Waheed as Azaan, Izzat's friend and her love interest, Shaan's brother
 Samina Peerzada as Mehwish, Izzat's Mothers and Syed's second wife 
 Shabbir Jan as Syed Omer, Izzat and Mehreen's father and Shahan's father in law
 Parveen Akber
 Shama Zaidi

References

External links

Pakistani drama television series
Urdu-language television shows
Atheism in television
Pakistani crime television series